Janusz Kazimierz Kierzkowski   (26 February 1947 – 19 August 2011) was a Polish cyclist. He won a bronze medal in the 1000m time trial at the 1968 Summer Olympics.

References

1947 births
2011 deaths
Cyclists at the 1968 Summer Olympics
Cyclists at the 1972 Summer Olympics
Cyclists at the 1976 Summer Olympics
Olympic cyclists of Poland
Polish male cyclists
Olympic bronze medalists for Poland
Olympic medalists in cycling
People from Gorzów County
Sportspeople from Lubusz Voivodeship
Medalists at the 1968 Summer Olympics
Polish track cyclists
20th-century Polish people